Lihuri station is located in Naupada–Gunupur branch line on the Odisha–Andhra border.

Geography
Location of Lihuri station is under limits of Odisha but Lihuri village is located in Srikakulam district of Andhra Pradesh. People have to ferry across River Vamsadhara (Bansadhara) to reach Lihuri station from Lihuri village.

History
The Paralakhemedi Light Railway opened the Naupada–Gunupur line between 1900 and 1931. The line was converted to broad gauge in 2011.

References

External links
  Trains at Lihuri

Railway stations on Naupada-Gunupur line
Railway stations in Gajapati district
Railway stations in Waltair railway division